Samuel Richards Hotel, is located in the Mays Landing section of Hamilton Township, Atlantic County, New Jersey, United States. The building was built in 1837 and added to the National Register of Historic Places on August 31, 1979.

See also
National Register of Historic Places listings in Atlantic County, New Jersey

References

Hamilton Township, Atlantic County, New Jersey
Hotel buildings on the National Register of Historic Places in New Jersey
Hotel buildings completed in 1837
National Register of Historic Places in Atlantic County, New Jersey
New Jersey Register of Historic Places
1837 establishments in New Jersey